The Finnish Open is a golf tournament played in Finland, currently on the Nordic Golf League. It was formerly an event on the Challenge Tour from 1990 until 2004. It was played at Espoon Golfseura in Espoo, Finland. It was founded as the Scandinavian Tipo Trophy before being sponsored by Volvo from 1991.

Winners

Notes

References

External links
Coverage on the Challenge Tour's official site

Former Challenge Tour events
Golf tournaments in Finland